Stratford Toney Down is a 23.1 hectare biological Site of Special Scientific Interest in Wiltshire, England, which was notified in 1987. It is important for the botanically rich chalk grassland – mainly sheep's fescue and meadow oat-grass – which supports several nationally rare plant and butterfly species.

References

Sites of Special Scientific Interest in Wiltshire
Sites of Special Scientific Interest notified in 1987